Konstantyn Sabov (4 January 1926 – 18 November 1982) was a Ruthenian Greek Catholic clandestine hierarch. He was an auxiliary bishop of the Ruthenian Catholic Eparchy of Mukacheve from 1977 to 1982.

Born in Simerky, Czechoslovakia (present day – Ukraine) in 1926,  he was clandestinely ordained a priest on 7 November 1956 by Bishop Alexander Chira for the Ruthenian Catholic Eparchy of Mukacheve. He never served openly as priest, because the Communist regime abolished the Greek-Catholic Church. On 16 July 1977 was consecrated to the Episcopate as auxiliary bishop. The principal and single consecrator was clandestine bishop Alexander Chira.

He died on 18 November 1982.

References 

1926 births
1982 deaths
20th-century Eastern Catholic bishops
Ruthenian Catholic bishops